The Solar Car Challenge is an annual solar-powered car race for high school students. The event attracts teams from around the world, but mostly from American high schools. The race was first held in 1995. Each event is the end product of a two-year education cycle launched by the Winston Solar Car Team. On odd-numbered years, the race is a road course that starts at the Texas Motor Speedway, Fort Worth, Texas; the end of the course varies from year to year. On even-numbered years, the race is a track race around the Texas Motor Speedway. Dell sponsored the event from 2002-2008. Hunt Oil Company sponsored the 2010 race.

History

In 1993, the Solar Car Team launched an education program to teach high school students how to build and safely race roadworthy solar cars.  The Solar Education Program met this objective, and worked to provide curriculum materials, on-site visits, and workshop opportunities for high schools across the country.  This program was designed to motivate students in the sciences, engineering, and technology.  The end product of each two-year education cycle is the Solar Car Challenge: a closed-track event at the world famous Texas Motor Speedway, or a cross country race designed to give students an opportunity to display their work.

The Solar Car Challenge is designed to motivate students into science, engineering, technology, and green energy engineering. The participants not only learn about importance of science to effectively have their car go a farther distance, but also learn the importance of teamwork, where teams work harmoniously with one another to do well in this challenge.

The participants in this race like to think of this as a challenge, rather than a competition, because this race focuses more detail in partnership and unity. This is how the idea of "The Spirit of Solar Car Racing" derived from, establishing an award known as the Marx Award (a prestigious award given to a single team member every year).

Teams experience the fun of the Solar Car Challenge at the Texas Motor Speedway.  Car breakdowns, weather, and team experience limit the number of laps a team can drive each day.  The team driving the most laps accumulated over the four days of racing will be declared the winner.

The purpose of the Solar Car Challenge is to provide a level playing-field for high school solar car teams.  Newer teams generally enter the Classic Division which requires participants to use less expensive conventional motors, lead acid batteries, and less efficient solar cells.  Older teams enter the Open Division based on their use of more expensive technology.  The new Advanced Division allows teams to use university body molds and more exotic batteries.

Teams seeking admission to the event must register their vehicle and demonstrate that their solar car complies with all the rules during a qualifying process known as “Scrutineering.”  In cross-country races, teams are licensed in Texas as experimental vehicles, and carry liability insurance.

Past races have traveled from Round Rock, which is Dell Computers Headquarters to California, Florida, New York, and Indiana. These races usually take place on odd-numbered years, and takes place at the Texas Motor Speedway on even-numbered years.

Closed Track are which take place at the Texas Motor Speedway usually take place on the odd-numbered years. These races normally go on for a week, while the Cross-Country take two to three weeks.

The Solar Car Challenge is the product of the Solar Education Program.  The Solar Car Challenge Foundation provides an international high school solar education program.  Workshops, curriculum materials, DVDs, and on site visits have introduced this challenge to more than 1100 schools in 20 countries.  The Solar Car Challenge Foundation is recognized by the IRS as a 501(c)(3) non-profit educational organization.

Each car must have a roll cage, "crush zones", safety harness, horn, communications, turn signals, and a fire extinguisher. Chase vehicles and trailers are available for support in the event of a breakdown on the track.  All aspects of the Solar Car Challenge Rules are closely monitored. A wireless computer network helps race officials closely monitor the individual cars.

The 2007 The Solar Car Challenge was featured on CNN affiliate KLTV.

The Solar Car Challenge was named one of America's 10 most innovative education programs by Business Wire in 2003.

See also

 Solar car racing
 World Solar Car Challenge
 The Quiet Achiever, the world's first solar-powered racecar

External links

References

Solar car races
Photovoltaics
Recurring sporting events established in 1995
Motorsport competitions in Texas